Member of Legislative Assembly Local Area Development Funds (MLA-LAD) are constituency development funds provided by India's states to their MLAs (Members of the Legislative Assembly). Each MLA can use their Fund for small development projects in their constituency.:27

States 
The MLA-LAD scheme was launched in Karnataka in the fiscal year 2001–02.

In Uttar Pradesh, the MLA-LAD funds are Rs 3 crore per year since 2020.

References 

Government of India